The National Antiviral Stockpile (NAS) is a federal Government of Canada response to the needs of the health care system in case of an emergency. It is a responsibility of the Public Health Agency of Canada (PHAC).

Synopsis
The NAS was begun immediately after the SARS pandemic that hit hospitals in Toronto particularly hard. While province of Ontario SARS Commissioner Justice Archie Campbell refrained from issuing any recommendations to form a stockpile, such need existed in the mind of the Martin government, who tasked their newly-instantiated Chief Public Health Officer of Canada with its roll-out. In the event, Dr David Butler-Jones performed the task.

The NAS anticipates a pandemic and therefore procures antiviral health supplies. The Federal Budget 2006 allocated $600 million for general pandemic planning and preparedness activities, such as the NAS:

See also
 National Emergency Stockpile System
 Strategic National Stockpile

References

Strategic reserves of Canada